The one-platoon system, also known as iron man football, is a platoon system in American football where players play on both offense and defense. It was the result of smaller roster sizes in the early days of the game and rules that limited player substitutions, rules that are also standard procedure in many other sports but were eliminated in the 1940s as free substitution was legalized. The alternative system is the two-platoon system (or simply the platoon system), which uses separate offensive and defensive units (three platoons if special teams is also counted).

Each system was used at different times in American college football and in the National Football League. One-platoon football is seen in modern times mostly on lower-end and smaller teams at the high school and semi-pro levels, where player shortages and talent disparities require it; the system allows teams to play with a smaller roster than a two-platoon or multiple-platoon team, but because players are on the field the entire game with no rest between series, players slow down and become fatigued more quickly in the later stages of a game. As a result, players were required to take breaks between play blocks. Modern teams with sufficient numbers of talented players no longer use the one-platoon system.

History
Before 1941, virtually all football players saw action on "both sides of the ball," playing in both offensive and defensive roles. From 1941 to 1952, the National Collegiate Athletic Association (NCAA) allowed unlimited substitution. This change was originally made because of the difficulty in fielding highly skilled players during the years of the Second World War, in which many able-bodied college-age men volunteered for or were drafted into military service. The National Football League followed suit abolishing its substitution restrictions in 1943, for similar reasons.

For the 1953 season, the NCAA emplaced a set of new rules requiring the use of a one-platoon system, primarily due to financial reasons. One source indicated that only one player was allowed to be substituted between plays; however, according to the NCAA, the actual rule allowed a player to enter the game only once in each quarter. More precisely, a player leaving the game in the first or third quarter could not return until the beginning of the next quarter, and a player leaving the game in the second or fourth quarter could not return until the final four minutes of that quarter.
Tennessee head coach "General" Robert Neyland praised the change as the end of "chickenshit football".

The one-platoon rules were gradually liberalized over the next 11 seasons; by 1958, Louisiana State had developed a three-platoon system (a two-way platoon, an offensive platoon, and a defensive platoon known as the Chinese Bandits). O. J. Simpson said after retiring from the NFL in 1979 that when he began playing football the best players played both ways, with the weakest only on defense and stronger players on offense.

For the 1964 season, the NCAA repealed the rules enforcing its use and allowed an unlimited number of player substitutions. This allowed, starting with the 1964 season, teams to form separate offensive and defensive units as well as "special teams" which would be employed in kicking situations. By the early 1970s, however, some university administrators, coaches and others were calling for a return to the days of one-platoon football.

The sport of arena football used a limited one-platoon system (from which quarterbacks, kickers and one "specialist" were exempt) from its inception until 2007.

Noteworthy professional one-platoon players
Pudge Heffelfinger – Yale and Allegheny Athletic Association  guard, defensive tackle who was the sport's first professional player.
Jim Thorpe – New York Giants halfback, defensive back, and drop kicker
Red Grange – Chicago Bears halfback, defensive back
Don Hutson – Green Bay Packers Split end, safety, and kicker who in various seasons was the league leader in offensive, defensive and special teams categories: touchdown receptions (from 1935–38 and again from 1940–44); interceptions (1940), extra points made and attempted (1941, 1942 & 1945), and field goals made (1943).
Sammy Baugh – Washington Redskins quarterback, tailback, defensive back, and punter credited with revolutionizing the use of the forward pass. Baugh was the 1943 NFL leader in passing, interceptions, and punting.
Chuck Bednarik – Pennsylvania and Philadelphia Eagles linebacker and center, first-overall 1949 NFL Draft selection, and the NFL's last full-time two-way player. Bednarik was an outspoken critic of the modern football player's lack of stamina under the two-platoon system.
E. J. Holub – Texas Tech and Kansas City Chiefs linebacker, center and long snapper, the last two-way player in major professional football (beginning two years after Bednarik retired).
Charley Trippi – Georgia college and Chicago Cardinals professional quarterback, halfback, punter, and return specialist, also switched to defense and remained punter for his final (1954, 1955) seasons with the Cardinals.  Jim Thorpe called Trippi "the greatest football player I ever saw."
Glen Hepburn – This University of Nebraska at Omaha graduate played both tight end and defensive end/linebacker and played three full seasons with the Omaha Mustangs, a minor professional team. He died September 12, 1968, age 29, in the second game of his fourth season with the Mustangs, from injuries sustained in a game four days prior.
Mike Furrey – After playing one-platoon football in the Arena Football League in 2002 and 2003, Furrey played on both sides of the ball with the NFL's St. Louis Rams, Detroit Lions, and Cleveland Browns at wide receiver and safety.  Furrey did not see defensive game action in a season in which he also started on offense. He has recorded 10 career pass deflections and four career interceptions on defense, and 221 career receptions and seven career touchdowns on offense.
Gordie Lockbaum – While his professional career was brief and mostly unsuccessful, Lockbaum was one of Division I college football's last full-time two-way players as a member of the Holy Cross Crusaders football squad.

References

Further reading
Wilmington Sunday Star article on its 1953 reintroduction

American football terminology